Battle of Neerwinden may refer to:
Battle of Neerwinden (1693), a battle between the French, British, and Dutch
Battle of Neerwinden (1793), a battle between the French and Austrians